Eidsvold East is a rural locality in the North Burnett Region, Queensland, Australia.

History 
The name Eidsvold is the name of the pastoral run operated in 1847-48 by Thomas Archer and David Archer, using the name of the town in Norway where Norwegian constitution was signed in 1814.

References 

North Burnett Region
Localities in Queensland